Sir Peter Malden Studd  (15 September 1916 – 22 June 2003) was an English cricketer and the 643rd Lord Mayor of London.

Biography
Peter Malden Studd was born 15 September 1916. Studd's father, Brigadier Malden A. Studd DSO MC, was ADC to King George VI during the early part of World War II.

Sir Peter Studd was the Lord Mayor of the City of London between 1970–1971 and an executive of De La Rue, the banknote printing company; as a young man he was an outstanding cricketer, captaining both the Harrow and Cambridge teams.

During his mayoralty was the re-opening of the transplanted London Bridge at Lake Havasu City, Arizona. The old bridge, which dated from 1831, had been sold by the City authorities for £1,025,000, and shipped to America to become the centrepiece of a new community. As Alderman Sheriff of the City of London in 1967, Studd and his wife attended the laying of the foundation stone and in October 1970 he returned in full regalia to join the state governor in an opening ceremony which featured a Lord Mayor's procession.

Studd was a great nephew of the famous Studd brothers who all captained Cambridge at Cricket. One of the brothers, Kynaston was also Lord Mayor of London. Like his forebear Sir Kynaston Studd, he was a governor of the Regent Street Polytechnic (now part of the University of Westminster).

Between 1973-4 Studd was also a master of the Merchant Taylors' Company, thus maintaining another long-standing Studd family connection. An equally long-standing family connection was English Freemasonry, and Peter Studd was an active member of the organisation, and a Past Master of the Lodge of Assistance No 2773 (London, England).

Positions and honours
Amongst his other positions were:
 Chairman of the Florence Nightingale Hospital
 President of the British Chiropractic Advancement Association
 Vice-president of the Arts Educational Schools
 Governor of Harrow
 Chairman of King George's Jubilee Trust

Studd was knighted in 1969 and advanced to GBE in 1971. He was appointed KCVO in 1979 in recognition of his work for the Prince's Trust, and became a Deputy Lieutenant for Wiltshire in 1983.

Legacy
It was Studd's hope that he might be remembered for his work as leader of the campaign to save the structure of St Paul's Cathedral.

The roof and fabric of the building had suffered from the ravages of time and the constant vibration from the London traffic. During his mayoralty he was able to help raise £3 million towards the project and for him was a highlight of his year of office. His fundraising efforts were impressive and he was even able to persuade President Richard Nixon to be the project's patron in America. As a result, money flooded in, including one donation of $10 from an American pensioner who had visited the cathedral during the First World War in 1917.

Her Majesty, Queen Elizabeth, The Queen Mother attended the celebrations at Mansion House which were held as a tribute to Sir Peter just before he left office.

Studd family and related articles

The Studd Brothers
Charles Studd
Sir Kynaston Studd
George Studd
Priscilla Studd

Cricketing records
Cricket records of PM Studd

References

STUDD, Sir Peter Malden, Who Was Who, A & C Black, 1920–2016 (online edition, Oxford University Press, 2014)

1916 births
2003 deaths
English cricketers
Cambridge University cricketers
Free Foresters cricketers
Sheriffs of the City of London
20th-century lord mayors of London
20th-century English politicians
Knights Bachelor
Knights Grand Cross of the Order of the British Empire
Knights Commander of the Royal Victorian Order
People educated at Harrow School
Alumni of Clare College, Cambridge
Deputy Lieutenants of Wiltshire